The 1955 Guild of Television Producers and Directors Awards were presented at the "Television Ball", held at the Savoy Hotel in London. They were the first major television awards of their kind in the United Kingdom. Following the Guild's merger with the British Film Academy they later became known as the British Academy Television Awards, under which title they are still given.

Winners
Actor
Paul Rogers
Actress
Googie Withers
Designer
Michael Yates
Personality
Sir Mortimer Wheeler
Production
Christian Sampson
Writer
Iain McCormack
Writers Award
Iain McCormack

References

Sources
Archive of winners on official BAFTA website (retrieved February 19, 2006).
BAFTA entry at the Encyclopedia of Television  (retrieved February 19, 2006).

External links
http://awards.bafta.org/

1955
Guild of Television Producers and Directors Awards
Guild of Television Producers and Directors Awards